An Acapella Christmas is the twentieth studio album released by The Manhattan Transfer in 2005 on the King Records label.  The album was initially released in Japan and was later released in the U.S. on October 3, 2006, on Rhino Records.

Track listing
 "Jingle Bells" (James Lord Pierpont) - 3:40
 "White Christmas" (Irving Berlin) - 4:18
 "Christmas Time Is Here" (Vince Guaraldi, Lee Mendelson) - 5:13
 "Good King Wenceslas" (traditional, lyrics by John Mason Neale) - 1:56
 "Toyland" (Victor Herbert, Glen MacDonough) - 4:54
 "My Grown-Up Christmas List" (David Foster, Linda Thompson-Jenner) - 4:18
 "Merry Christmas Baby" (Lou Baxter, Johnny Moore) - 3:17
 "I'll Be Home for Christmas" (Walter Kent, Kim Gannon, Buck Ram) - 3:39
 "Christmas Is Coming" (traditional) - 1:49
 "Winter Wonderland" (Felix Bernard, Richard B. Smith) - 2:46

Personnel 

The Manhattan Transfer
 Cheryl Bentyne – vocals 
 Tim Hauser – vocals, vocal arrangements (9)
 Alan Paul – vocals, vocal arrangements (1)
 Janis Siegel – vocals, vocal percussion (2), vocal arrangements (2)

Additional personnel
 Yaron Gershovsky – vocal arrangements (2, 8), additional voicings (4)
 Roger Treece – vocal percussion (2), vocal arrangements (3, 5), arrangements (9)
 Gladys Pitcher – vocal arrangements (4)
 Zoë Allen – choir (4), vocals (6)
 Lily Hauser – choir (4)
 Basie Hauser – choir (4)
 Arielle Paul – choir (4)
 Keely Pickering – choir (4)
 Gabriel Skoletsky – choir (4)
 Mark Kibble – vocal arrangements (6)
 Jack Scandura – vocal arrangements (7)
 Thomas Baraka DiCandia – arrangements (9)
 Corey Allen – arrangements (10)

Production 
 Tim Hauser – producer, mastering
 Roger Treece – co-producer
 Thomas Baraka DiCandia – recording, remixing, mastering 
 Michael Wallace – additional engineer 
 Yaron Gershovsky – pre-production supervision
 Kiyoshi Osada – artwork 
 Lee Ann Licht – booklet photography 
 Hideo Oida – back cover photography 

Studios 
 Recorded and Mastered at TGV Studios (Sun Valley and LaTuna Canyon, California).

External links 
 The Manhattan Transfer Official Website

The Manhattan Transfer albums
King Records (Japan) albums
2005 Christmas albums
Christmas albums by American artists
Jazz Christmas albums
A cappella Christmas albums